Giorgos Kyriakakis was born in 1967 in Crete where he took his first music lessons.

He studied composition and analysis with Joseph Papadatos and Byzantine music with Lykourgos Angelopoulos at the Philippos Nakas Conservatory of Athens. He continued his studies in composition, music for the media, music of non-European cultures at with Dimitri Terzakis and in electroacoustic composition with Eckhard Roedger at the University of Music and Theatre Leipzig. He has composed works for children's theatre, for the cinema as well as music for solo instruments, chamber ensembles, choir and orchestra. His compositions have been performed in Greece and abroad. His works have been recorded by FM Records and ARKYS. He is a member of the Greek Composers' Union and the Deutscher Komponistenverband. Since 2006 he has been elected as assistant professor of composition and contemporary music in the Department of Music Art and Science, University of Macedonia, Thessaloniki. He was until 2009 a producer of the Greek broadcast (ERA2). His works are being published by Edition Gravis. He lives and works as a free composer in Berlin.

In 2017, he conducted an Argentine tango of Astor Piazzolla at the Landesfunkhaus Niedersachsen.

References

External links
kyriakakis.de

1967 births
Living people
20th-century classical composers
21st-century classical composers
Greek classical composers
Male classical composers
University of Music and Theatre Leipzig alumni
20th-century male musicians
21st-century male musicians
People from Crete